Siccia guttulosana is a moth of the family Erebidae first described by Francis Walker in 1863. It is found in India and Sri Lanka.

References

Moths of Asia
Moths described in 1863